Wiejca  is a village in the administrative district of Gmina Kampinos, within Warsaw West County, Masovian Voivodeship, in east-central Poland.

This facility, whose Polish designation is SLR Wiecja, was used from 1974 to 1991 for the radio relay link between Warsaw and RCN Konstantynow.

References

Wiejca